Vytautas Švedas (born 7 January 1983) is a Lithuanian rally driver, currently driving for Juta Racing in Lithuanian Rally Championship. He is a seven-time Lithuanian rally champion, having won his recent championship in 2015.

2000–2001: Early Career
Vytautas Švedas began his auto racing career in 2000, driving a Volkswagen Polo. That year he finished second in N-1400 class of Lithuanian rallycross championship. Next year he triumphed in N-1600 class.

2002–present: Rallying

Švedas made his rally debut in Lithuanian Rally Championship in 2002 and together with co-driver Kęstutis Švedas became vice champions in A,R-1600 class. He placed 17th in overall standings. Next year he repeated the same achievement in A,R-1600 class, this time with co-driver Ernestas Staponkus. Žilvinas Sakalauskas became Švedas's co-driver for 2004 season. He also got a new rally car, seventh generation Mitsubishi Lancer Evolution, and finished third in N/S-4 class.

Vytautas Švedas took his first N-4 class championship title in 2005 and repeated the same fate in 2006. In the same year he finished fourth in Estonian rally championship and made his debut in WRC, competing in Rally Finland.

Švedas successfully defended his N-4 title in 2007 and 2008. However, in 2009 he finished as runner-up, but regained his title in 2011. After finishing second in 2012, Švedas won his sixth title in 2013 and added one more in 2015.

During his career Švedas had started in six WRC rounds, with best result of 15th in 2009 Rally Poland. He also started in four ERC events, with eight in 2013 Rally Liepāja–Ventspils as a best result.

Racing record

Complete WRC results

Complete ERC results

References

External links
 
 
 Results at ewrc-results.com

1983 births
Living people
Lithuanian racing drivers
European Rally Championship drivers
World Rally Championship drivers